Mohammadabad-e Tezerj (also Romanized as Moḩammadābād-e Tezerj; also known as Moḩammadābād, Moḩammadābād-e Tazerch, Moḩammadābād Tazerch, and Muhammadābād) is a village in Balvard Rural District, in the Central District of Sirjan County, Kerman Province, Iran. At the 2006 census, its population was 93, in 29 families.

References 

Populated places in Sirjan County